Jason Luis Silva Mishkin (born February 6, 1982) is a Venezuelan-American television personality, filmmaker, futurist, philosopher, and public speaker. He is known for hosting the National Geographic documentaries Brain Games and Origins. He has stated that his goal is to use technology to excite people about philosophy and science. The Atlantic describes Silva as "A Timothy Leary of the Viral Video Age". Silva, a former presenter on Current TV, lectures internationally on such topics as creativity, spirituality, technology, and humanity, and writes and produces short films.

Personal life
Silva was born in Caracas, Venezuela. His mother, Linda Mishkin, an artist, is Ashkenazi Jewish. His father, Luis Manuel Silva, converted to Judaism, but, according to Silva, they were secular and lived in a household "more akin to a Woody Allen film" with lots of humor and love for art and theater. He is also brother to Jordan Silva and Paulina Silva.

Inspired by Charles Baudelaire's Hashish House, Silva's obsession with filmmaking and documentation started as a teenager when he hosted "salons" at his house to discuss ideas. Video, rather than pen, became his preferred way to memorialize what he calls "ecstatic moments". For Silva, it is not enough to "feel" the experience. These moments need to be "narrated in real time."

Silva earned a degree in film and philosophy from the University of Miami in Coral Gables, Florida. He, along with Max Lugavere, produced and starred in a video documentary/performance piece entitled "Textures of Selfhood." The short, experimental film about hedonism and spirituality based on Silva's and Lugavere's life in Miami, gained the attention of Current producers who were looking for "passionate storytellers".

Silva currently lives in Amsterdam.

Career 
Silva is a self-described wonder junkie and performance philosopher, a term he first heard on a website called Space Collective by Rene Daalder. He uses television, online media and lecture halls to share his perspectives. For example, in the video The Mirroring Mind, Silva "explores human consciousness and the creation of that consciousness through self-reference."

Public speaking 
An active and prolific speaker, Silva has spoken at Google, The Economist Ideas Festival, the prestigious DLD Digital Life Design Conference in Munich, TEDGlobal, the Singularity Summit, the PSFK Conference, and the Festival of Dangerous Ideas.

At TEDGlobal in June 2012, Jason premiered a short video entitled "Radical Openness".  In September 2012, Silva presented his Radical Openness videos at the opening keynote at Microsoft TechEd Australia. Radical Openness was also featured in his presentation at La Ciudad de las Ideas conference on November 10, 2012.

In September 2012, he presented "We Are the Gods Now" at the Festival of Dangerous Ideas.

Television

Current TV 
From 2005 to 2011, Silva was a presenter and producer on Al Gore's cable network Current TV.

Brain Games 
In 2013, Silva and Apollo Robbins became the hosts of Brain Games on the National Geographic Channel. The show explores the brain through interactive games that look at perception, decision-making, and patterning, as well as how easily the brain can be fooled. Experts in psychology, cognitive science and neuroscience appear on the show, as Silva states, "to make sure we're doing the science right." The show, which premiered in 2011, received 1.5 million viewers for episodes one and two and set a National Geographic record as the highest rated series launch in that channel's history.

Origins: The Journey of Humankind 
Released in 2017 as a part of the National Geographic Channel, Jason Silva hosted this short series. Origins explores the very beginning of mankind and rewinds all the way back to the beginning, tracing the innovations that made us modern. The series features 8 episodes of approximately 45 minutes running time each. There has only been one season confirmed as of yet for Origins.

Guest appearances
In August 2012, he appeared on CBS This Morning. In September 2012, he appeared on Australian ABC program Q&A. He has appeared as a guest on Season 2 of StarTalk.

Original internet content

"Shots of Awe"
In May 2013, Jason began "Shots of Awe", a YouTube channel on the Discovery Digital Networks TestTube, presenting weekly "micro-documentaries" on creativity, innovation, exponential technology, futurism, metaphysics, existentialism and the human condition. Zoltan Istvan, editor for the Huffington Post, wrote that Shots of Awe is a blend of philosophy and art and has been massively popular to the younger generation.

Other appearances
In October 2013, he appeared on YouTube for Google and NASA's Quantum Artificial Intelligence Lab.

He has appeared multiple times as a guest on the Joe Rogan Experience podcast.

In March 2014, he was a guest in an episode of SourceFed's Tabletalk.

In December 2017, he appeared as a guest host on the trivia app HQ Trivia.

Silva has a chapter giving advice in Tim Ferriss' book Tools of Titans.

Other accomplishments
Silva has been featured in The Atlantic, The Economist, Vanity Fair, Forbes, Wired, and many others.

In 2011, he became a fellow at the Hybrid Reality Institute, examining the symbiosis between man and machine.

His film ATTENTION: The Immersive Power of Cinema was part of the exhibition 'KINO und der kinamatografische Blick' ('CINEMA and the cinematographic gaze'), 20 March - 2 June 2013, at MEWO Kunsthalle in Memmingen (Germany).

In 2014, Silva served as advisor for National Geographic Channel's Expedition Granted competition in which finalists are chosen based on their project's originality, viability and potential impact on either the local or global community.

Conferences and lectures
"Critical Crossroads" at the TEDGlobal 2012 "Radical Openness" Conference, Edinburgh Scotland (June 2012)
"Radical Openness" at the Zeitgeist Media Festival 2012, Los Angeles, with James Cromwell and Rutger Hauer
The Mirroring Mind SXSW, Austin, Texas (March 2013)
Jason Silva: Technologies of Immersion Tribeca Film Festival "Future of Film Series", New York, NY (2014)
"Innovation and Thinking Differently" at the Rockwell Lecture Series, Cullen Performance Hall, University of Houston (October 2015) 
Keynote at the LiNC'16 (Lithium Networking Conference), San Francisco (June 2016)
Teradata Partners 2017, General Session Keynote, October 25, 2017, Anaheim, California

References

External links 
Official website
 

1982 births
Living people
People from Caracas
Venezuelan television personalities
University of Miami alumni
Current TV
Venezuelan emigrants to the United States
Futurologists
American transhumanists
American people of Venezuelan-Jewish descent